Torin Herbert Erskine Thatcher (15 January 1905 – 4 March 1981) was a British actor who was noted for his flashy portrayals of screen villains.

Personal life
Thatcher was born in Bombay, British India, to British parents, Torin James Blair Thatcher, a police officer, and his wife Edith Rachel, a voice and piano teacher, younger daughter of the Hon. Justice Sir Herbert Batty, a puisne judge of the High Court of Bombay. He was educated in England at Bedford School and at the Royal Academy of Dramatic Art. He worked as a schoolmaster before first appearing on the London stage in 1927 and then entering British films in 1934.

Career

In 1935 he appeared in the historical play Mary Tudor. He appeared in the 1937 Old Vic production of Hamlet, in which Laurence Olivier made his first appearance in the title role, opposite Vivien Leigh as Ophelia. 

During the Second World War, he served with the Royal Artillery and was demobilised with the rank of lieutenant colonel.

Thatcher appeared in classic British films of the late 1930s and 1940s, including Major Barbara (1941) and Great Expectations (1946), in which he played Bentley Drummle. He moved to Hollywood in the 1950s. He was constantly in demand, invariably lending his looming figure and baleful countenance to sinister or stern roles in popular costume thrillers such as The Crimson Pirate (1952), Blackbeard the Pirate (1952), The Robe (1953) (as the disapproving father of Marcellus), The Black Shield of Falworth (1954), Helen of Troy (1956), Darby's Rangers (1958) and The 7th Voyage of Sinbad (1958). He was a formidable prosecutor in Witness for the Prosecution (1957) and also appeared in the Marlon Brando and Trevor Howard 1962 remake of Mutiny on the Bounty.

He returned to the stage frequently, notably on Broadway, in such esteemed productions as Edward, My Son (1948), That Lady (1949) and Billy Budd (1951). In 1959, he portrayed Captain Keller in the award-winning play The Miracle Worker with Anne Bancroft and Patty Duke. All of these plays were filmed, but Thatcher did not appear in the film versions. Also a steady fixture on television, he appeared in such made-for-TV films as adaptations of A.J. Cronin's Beyond This Place (1957) and The Citadel (1960), and Brenda Starr (1976). 

He played the title role in a Philco Television Playhouse version of Othello and acted in a CBS production of Beyond This Place (1957). He appeared in programmes such as The Real McCoys, Thriller, Gunsmoke (“Fandango” - S12E21), Perry Mason, Voyage to the Bottom of the Sea, Daniel Boone, Wagon Train (S2E32) and Mission: Impossible. He was cast as the sly space trader in an episode of Lost in Space. Thatcher, if not for his distinguished career, has been recognized by several generations of fans of Star Trek: The Original Series from his performance as Marplon, a member of the secret resistance in "The Return of the Archons".

Death
Thatcher died of cancer on 4 March 1981, in Thousand Oaks, California.

Select filmography

The Merchant of Venice (1927, Short) - Solanio
Red Wagon (1933) - Minor role (uncredited)
Irish Hearts (1934) - Dr. Hackey
School for Stars (1935) - Guy Mannering
The Common Round (1936, Short) - Martin
The Man Who Could Work Miracles (1936) - Observer
Crime Over London (1936) - Mr. Finley (uncredited)
Sabotage (1936) - Yunct (uncredited)
Well Done, Henry (1936) - George Canford
Dark Journey (1937) - Strasser (uncredited)
The School for Scandal (1937, TV Movie)
Knight Without Armor (1937) - British Passport Official (uncredited)
Return of the Scarlet Pimpernel (1937) - Minor role (uncredited)
Young and Innocent (1937) - Nobby's Lodging House Caretaker (uncredited)
Broadway (1938, TV Movie) 
Climbing High (1938) - Jim Castle
Too Dangerous to Live (1939) - Burton
The Day Is Gone (1939, TV Movie) - Ernest Webb
The Spy in Black (1939) - Submarine Officer
Old Mother Riley, MP (1939) - Jack Nelson
The Lion Has Wings (1939) - Seaman Receiving Information About German Activity
The Kindled Flame (1939, Short)
Contraband (1940) - Sailor (uncredited)
Law and Disorder (1940)
Let George Do It! (1940) - U-Boat Commander
Night Train to Munich (1940) - Minor Role (uncredited)
The Case of the Frightened Lady (1940) - Jim Tilling (uncredited)
Saloon Bar (1940) - Mr. Garrod (uncredited)
Gasbags (1941) - SS Man
Major Barbara (1941) - Todger Fairmile
Saboteur (1942) - Man (uncredited)
The Next of Kin (1942) - German General
The Captive Heart (1946) - German officer at Medical Commission (uncredited)
I See a Dark Stranger (1946) - Police Constable
Great Expectations (1946) - Bentley Drummle
The Man Within (1947) - Jailer
Jassy (1947) - Bob Wicks
When the Bough Breaks (1947) - Adams
The End of the River (1947) - Lisboa
The Fallen Idol (1948) - Policeman
Bonnie Prince Charlie (1948) - Col. Kor
Now Barabbas (1949) (uncredited)
The Black Rose (1950) - Harry (uncredited)
Affair in Trinidad (1952) - Inspector Smythe
The Crimson Pirate (1952) - Humble Bellows
The Snows of Kilimanjaro (1952) - Johnson
Blackbeard the Pirate (1952) - Sir Henry Morgan
The Desert Rats (1953) - Col. Barney White
Houdini (1953) - Otto 
The Robe (1953) - Senator Gallio
Knock on Wood (1954) - Godfrey Langston
The Black Shield of Falworth (1954) - Sir James
Bengal Brigade (1954) - Colonel Morrow
Love Is a Many-Splendored Thing (1955) - Humphrey Palmer-Jones
Lady Godiva of Coventry (1955) - Lord Godwin
Diane (1956) - Louis - Count de Breze
Helen of Troy (1956) - Ulysses
Istanbul (1957) - Douglas Fielding
Band of Angels (1957) - Capt. Canavan
Witness for the Prosecution (1957) - Mr. Myers
Darby's Rangers (1958) - Sgt. McTavish
The 7th Voyage of Sinbad (1958) - Sokurah the Magician
The Miracle (1959) - The Duke of Wellington
One Step Beyond - Doomsday (TV) - Season 2, Episode 4, October 13 1959 - Earl of Culdane
’’ Wagon Train’’. (1960) - Campden
The Canadians (1961) - Sergeant McGregor
Jack the Giant Killer (1962) - Pendragon
Mutiny on the Bounty (1962) - Staines (uncredited)
Drums of Africa (1963) - Jack Cuortemayn
Decision at Midnight (1963) - Southstream
From Hell to Borneo (1964) - Mr. Bellflower
The Sandpiper (1965) - Judge Thompson
Hawaii (1966) - Rev. Dr. Thorn
The Sweet and the Bitter (1967) - Duncan MacRoy
The King's Pirate (1967) - Captain Cullen
The Strange Case of Dr. Jekyll and Mr. Hyde (1968, TV Movie) - Sir John Turnbull

References

External links

1905 births
1981 deaths
English male film actors
English male stage actors
English male television actors
People educated at Bedford School
Alumni of RADA
Deaths from cancer in California
Royal Artillery officers
British Army personnel of World War II
20th-century English male actors
British people in colonial India
British expatriate male actors in the United States